Abbotsfield School for Boys was an all-boys school in Hillingdon, West London. It closed on 20 July 2017, replaced on the site by the new co-ed Oak Wood School, which officially opened on 1 September 2017, under the same head teacher, Mark Bland.

Notable pupils
Notable former pupils of the school include:

Peter Bennett, West Ham footballer
Russell Grant, astrologer
Harry Harrison, cartoonist
Barry King, Olympic decathlete
Ian Mosley, drummer with Marillion
Rowland Rivron, comedian
Robert Thatcher, Olympic Rower

References

External links
 

Defunct schools in the London Borough of Hillingdon
Boys' schools in London
Educational institutions established in 1953
1953 establishments in England
Educational institutions disestablished in 2017
2017 disestablishments in England